Bounce Back may refer to:

 "Bounce Back" (Fire on Blonde song), 1987
 Bounce Back (album), a 1990 album by Alisha
 "Bounce Back" (Stacie Orrico song), 2002
 "Bounce Back" (Juvenile song), 2003
 "Bounce Back" (Big Sean song), 2016
 "Bounce Back" (Little Mix song), 2019
 "Bounce Back", a song by Vaneese Thomas from Shining Time Station
 Bounce Back, in Bounce (video game series)
 The Bounce Back, a 2016 film
 Bounce Back Loan Scheme, for UK companies during  2020 covid epidemic